is a railway station on the Hōhi Main Line, operated by JR Kyushu in Higashi-ku, Kumamoto, Japan. The station name means, literally, in front of Tokai University.

Lines

Layout 
The station consists of a side platform serving a single track at grade. There is no station building only a shelter on the platform. A staffed ticket booth is located on the other side of the track, within the premises of the Tokai University Kumamoto campus. From there, a level crossing is used to access the platform.

Management of the station has been outsourced to the JR Kyushu Tetsudou Eigyou Co., a wholly owned subsidiary of JR Kyushu specialising in station services. It staffs the ticket booth which is equipped with a POS machine but does not have a Midori no Madoguchi facility.

Adjacent stations

History
Japanese National Railways (JNR) opened the station on 1 November 1986 as an addition station on the existing track of the Hōhi Main Line. With the privatization of JNR on 1 April 1987, Takio came under the control of JR Kyushu.

Passenger statistics
In fiscal 2016, the station was used by an average of 1,622 passengers daily (boarding passengers only), and it ranked 111st among the busiest stations of JR Kyushu.

See also
List of railway stations in Japan

References

External links
Tōkai-Gakuen-mae (JR Kyushu)

Railway stations in Kumamoto Prefecture
Railway stations in Japan opened in 1986